Hermann Joha (born 17 February 1960 in Lohr, Bavaria) is a German television producer.

Career 
Hermann Joha began his career as a stunt performer when he joined a British Hell Drivers team at the age of 17 years. Later he started working for German television. Eventually he became founder and CEO of TV production company action concept. When RTL Television was looking for an adequate second unit team in order to realise the German action TV series Alarm für Cobra 11 – Die Autobahnpolizei, they turned to action concept. Soon after Joha's company took over completely. Consequently action concept created several TV series including "Der Clown", "112 – Sie retten dein Leben" and "Lasko – Die Faust Gottes". In 2000 Joha was a Grimme-Preis nominee. His company action concept is a sevenfold Taurus World Stunt Award winner.

Accolades 
Deutscher Fernsehpreis 2012

References

External links 
 

1960 births
German television producers
Living people
Mass media people from Bavaria
People from Lohr am Main